The Food Lovers' Guide to Australia is an Australian food and travel television show presented by Maeve O'Meara and Joanna Savill and produced and broadcast by SBS. In the series, O'Meara and Savill travel across Australia, discovering the country's multicultural culinary delights and showcasing the talents of home cooks and professional chefs. The series first aired on 21 December 1996, and ran for five seasons, with the fifth season premiering on 14 September 2005. The series has won numerous awards, including the World Food Media Award for Best Food/Drink TV show in 2005; and a plethora of Australian food broadcasting awards.

Series Overview

References

External links 
 The Food Lovers Guide To Australia at the National Film and Sound Archive

Special Broadcasting Service original programming
Australian cooking television series
1996 Australian television series debuts
2006 Australian television series endings